Shields is a surname. Notable people with the surname include:

 Brooke Shields (born 1965), American actress
 Carol Shields (1935–2003), American author
 Carol Shields (ophthalmologist) (born 1957), American doctor
 Clayton Shields (born 1976), American basketball player
 Colin Shields (born 1980), British ice hockey player
 Derek "Mob" Shields (born 1977), a member of the Lords of Chaos
 Eileen Shields (born 1970), American footwear designer
 Francis Alexander Shields (1941–2003), Brooke Shields' father
 Frank Shields (1909–1975), American tennis player and actor
 Frederic Shields (1833–1911), British artist, illustrator and designer
 George Oliver Shields (1846–1925), American outdoors magazine editor 
 Harry Shields (1899–1971), American dixieland jazz musician 
 Jake Shields (born 1979), American mixed martial arts fighter
 James Shields (politician, born 1810) (1810–1879), American politician and U.S. Army officer
 James Shields (politician, born 1762) (1762–1831), U.S. Representative from Ohio
 James Shields (baseball) (born 1981), American baseball player
 Jimi Shields (born 1967), Irish musician and architect
 John Shields (disambiguation)
 Kevin Shields (born 1963), Irish musician
 Kathy Shields, Canadian basketball coach
 Ken Shields (basketball), Canadian basketball coach
 Larry Shields (1893–1953), American dixieland jazz clarinetist
 Lonnie Shields (born 1956), American blues singer, songwriter, and guitarist 
 Mark Shields (1937–2022), American political pundit
 Mark Shields (police commissioner) (born 1959), Jamaica's Deputy Police Commissioner
 Michael Shields (disambiguation)
 Mick Shields (1912–1983), Australian rugby league footballer
 Nicki Shields, British television presenter
 Paul Shields (disambiguation)
 Pete Shields (1891–1961), American baseball player
 Rev. Robert Shields (1918–2007), American minister and diarist
 Sam Shields (born 1987), American football player
 Scot Shields (born 1975), American baseball player
 Steve Shields (baseball) (born 1958), American baseball player
 Steve Shields (basketball coach) (born 1965), American basketball coach
 Steve Shields (ice hockey) (born 1972), Canadian ice hockey player
 Teri Shields (1933–2012), Brooke Shields' mother
 Thomas Todhunter Shields (1873–1955), Canadian religious leader
 Tyler Shields (born 1982), American photographer
 Will Shields (born 1971), American football player
 Willow Shields (born 2000), American actress

See also
 Shiels, a surname
 Shields (disambiguation)

English-language surnames